Aimé Clariond (10 May 1894 – 31 December 1959) was a French stage and film actor.

Clariond was born in Périgueux, Dordogne, France and died in Paris.

Selected filmography

 The Brothers Karamazov (1931) - Ivan Karamazoff
 Amourous Adventure (1932)
 Take Care of Amelie (1932)
 The Faceless Voice (1933) - Maître Clément
 Mariage à responsabilité limitée (1934)
 La belle de nuit (1934) - Claude Davène
 Sans famille (1934) - James Milligan
 Prince Jean (1934) - Le baron d'Arnheim
 La Route impériale (1935) - Col. Stark
 Crime and Punishment (1935) - Loujine
 Lucrezia Borgia (1935) - Niccollo Machiavelli
 L'île des veuves (1937) - Richard Trent
 The Lie of Nina Petrovna (1937) - Baron Engern
 La Marseillaise (1938) - Monsieur de Saint Laurent
 Boys' School (1938) - M. Boisse - le directeur
 The Little Thing (1938) - Monsieur Eyssette père
 Katia (1938) - Le comte Schowaloff
 Le révolté (1938) - Commandant Derive
 Behind the Facade (1939) - Le président Bernier
 Entente cordiale (1939) - L'ambassadeur de Russie
 Coups de feu (1939) - Le Capitaine Hans von Mahringer
 Paris-New York (1940) - M. de Saintonge
 Sarajevo (1940) - Le prince de Montenuovo
 Madame Sans-Gêne (1941) - Le chef de la police Fouché
 Miss Bonaparte (1942) - Le duc de Morny
 The Duchess of Langeais (1942) - Ronquerolles
 L'homme qui joue avec le feu (1942) - Monsieur Desert
 Le Destin fabuleux de Désirée Clary (1942) - Joseph Bonaparte
 Les affaires sont les affaires (1942) - Le marquis de Porcellet
 Monsieur La Souris (1942) - Simon Negretti
 Patricia (1942) - Jacques Pressac
 The Blue Veil (1942) - Le juge d'instruction
 The Count of Monte Cristo (1943) - Monsieur de Villefort
 L'auberge de l'abîme (1943) - Le docteur Thierry
 Le chant de l'exilé (1943) - Riedgo
 The Phantom Baron (1943) - L'évêque
 The Midnight Sun (1943) - Grégor
 Les Roquevillard (1943) - Maître Bastard
 Domino (1943) - Heller
 Ceux du rivage (1943) - Rocheteau
 Donne-moi tes yeux (1943) - Jean Laurent
 Colonel Chabert (1943) - Maître Derville
 The White Waltz (1943) - Le professeur d'Estérel
 La vie de plaisir (1944) - Monsieur de Lormel - un aristocrate désargenté, le père d'Hélène
 L'enfant de l'amour (1944) - Rantz
 Mademoiselle X (1945) - Michel Courbet
 La Grande Meute (1945) - Martin du Bocage
 My First Love (1945) - Le romancier Maurice Fleurville
 The Captain (1946) - Concini
 Strange Fate (1946) - Le professeur Gallois
 Monsieur Grégoire s'évade (1946) - M. Berny
 The Eternal Husband (1946) - Michel Veltchaninov
 Les aventures de Casanova (1947) - Don Luis
 The Seventh Door (1947) - Le fonctionnaire
 Le café du cadran (1947) - Luigi
 Monsieur Vincent (1947) - Le cardinal de Richelieu
 Fantomas Against Fantomas (1949) - Bréval
 56 Rue Pigalle (1949) - Ricardo de Montalban
 The Farm of Seven Sins (1949) - Le marquis de Siblas
 The Dancer of Marrakesh (1949) - Marcadier
 La ronde des heures (1950) - Méry-Mirecourt
 The Dancer of Marrakesh (1950) - Barjac
 Rue des Saussaies (1951) - Cortedani
 Foyer perdu (1952) - Georges Fontaine
 Royal Affairs in Versailles (1954) - Rivarol
 Napoleon (1955) - Corvisart (uncredited)
 Je suis un sentimental (1955) - M. de Villeterre
 If Paris Were Told to Us (1956) - Beaumarchais
 Le Secret de soeur Angèle (1956) - Le médecin-chef
 Deadlier Than the Male (1956) - Monsieur Prévost
 Marie Antoinette Queen of France (1956) - Louis XV
 Les Lumières du soir (1956) - Franz Hassler
 Three Days to Live (1957) - Charlie Bianchi
 On Foot, on Horse, and on Wheels (1957) - M. de Grandlieu
 Nathalie (1957) - Le comte Auguste Claude Superbe de Lancy
 The Possessors (1958) - Gérard de La Monnerie
 Délit de fuite (1959) - Aitken
 Une fille pour l'été (1960) - Rosenkrantz (final film role)

Bibliography
 Waldman, Harry. Maurice Tourneur: The Life and Films. McFarland & Co, 2008.

External links

1894 births
1960 deaths
French male stage actors
French male film actors
20th-century French male actors
Sociétaires of the Comédie-Française
People from Périgueux